Kyle Harmon is a fictional character on the CBS crime drama CSI: Miami, portrayed by Evan Ellingson and has appeared in 19 episodes.

Kyle is the son of the show's protagonist, Lieutenant Horatio Caine. He has been occupied as a student and a city morgue assistant, and is currently a soldier in the United States Army.

Background 
Kyle Harmon was born on July 6, 1991, to "John Walden" (undercover alias of Horatio Caine at the time) and Julia Eberly in Pensacola, Florida. Through unknown events, Harmon ended up in the foster care system. Around age 15, Harmon (now living in Miami) stole a boat on Biscayne Bay and was arrested for the offense. The crime was alcohol-related. He served six months in juvenile detention then was released on parole with an ankle-bracelet monitor. Harmon's parole officer, Andrew Bennet, secured him a job at the Miste Cafe, where another parolee and co-worker coerced him into committing a felony, and was sent to an adult prison to await trial. Kyle didn't know who his father was, but a dangerous escapee, who also arranged to have Kyle kidnapped and hidden within the prison as revenge, found out by chance. Lt. Caine told Kyle about their relationship when he located and freed him from a maintenance tunnel next to Block C. Caine then arranged protection for Kyle from another prisoner. The background of Kyle's last name remains unclear.

Personal life 
In "Dangerous Son," parole officer Andrew Bennet is murdered and Harmon, having recently broken his parole agreement to abstain from alcohol, is brought in for questioning. While being interrogated by Eric Delko, Horatio Caine spots the boy and suspects a biological relationship, previously unknown to both parties. Meanwhile, Harmon kidnaps a woman named Kathleen Newbury and demands cash for her ransom. It is later revealed that a fellow employee at the Miste Cafe blackmails him into the crime. Nevertheless, Harmon is arrested after running from the Coast Guard.

While in prison, Harmon finds himself a prime target by the gangsters after it is known that his father is a police officer. He is kidnapped by Joe LeBrock and left to die in a maintenance pipeline. He is rescued by Caine, who then proceeds to reveal his paternal relationship to Harmon. From then on, Harmon is protected by Oscar Monahan who is acting on Caine's orders. However, when Monahan is murdered by a bomb triggered by the cellphone found in Harmon's bunk, the boy becomes a prime suspect. He is questioned by his father, but Harmon claims to not know anything about the phone. Caine later realizes that Harmon lied, and that the phone did belong to him, but unknown to him, it had been rigged by LeBrock's men. Caine still manages to prove Harmon's innocence in the murder of Oscar Monahan.

Harmon's day in court arrives, and he finds himself amongst his father and his mother, Julia Winston, who has suddenly reappeared. The key witness in Harmon's case does not appear, and the judge dismisses the charges. The judge also informs Harmon that both his parents have filed separate petitions for custody for him, and that he must choose with whom he will live. Although he appears to struggle with the decision, Harmon ultimately chooses to go with his mother.

During the events of "Bombshell," Caine breaks up a fistfight between Harmon and his adult neighbor. This neighbor ultimately ends up murdered, and Harmon once again becomes a suspect. Harmon insists to Caine that he had nothing to do with the murder, but is hesitant when Caine starts question whether Harmon's mother could have had anything to do with it. The murderer is revealed to be neither Harmon nor his mother, and both walk free.

Harmon is brought to the station after being pulled over while driving erratically with his mother in the passenger seat. Caine finds out that Harmon was attempting to get his mother to her job interview on time and she was the one who had continually told him to go faster despite his protests. It becomes clear at this point that Winston is psychologically unstable. Attempting to give him some stability and to get him away from his mother, Caine secures Harmon a job as the ME Dr. Tara Price's assistant. Although Harmon breaks the protocol the first day by letting Winston visit the morgue without permission, Tara allows him to keep his job and he seems to enjoy it. He again unknowingly breaks protocol the first day when he answers a murder victim's cell phone while it rings. In doing so however, he breaks the case wide open. Caine explains that while he broke the case, he shouldn't touch others' personal effects without clearance as it may be potential evidence. Caine also sets up Harmon in his own apartment, explaining that in living there comes a greater responsibility.

Harmon catches Tara taking a pill and confronts her about it. She lies, and he calls her on it, to which she angrily responds, "I don't have to explain myself to you, Kyle."

During "Collateral Damage," a grenade explodes in the morgue, throwing Ryan Wolfe, Tara Price, and Harmon across the room. No one is injured, but Harmon is extremely shaken up. He expresses to Wolfe that he feels responsible for the grenade because he knocked it out of the victim's clothes but Wolfe tells him that accidents always happen.

During "Dissolved," Harmon expresses to Caine that he is struggling to cope with his mother's psychological instability. Winston appears to be calling Harmon nonstop, as well as going into his apartment uninvited. Winston eventually breaks into the morgue, where Tara, Wolfe, Harmon, and an unnamed intern are, and starts shooting. She waves the gun around and demands that Harmon come with her. Harmon agrees to go if she will put the gun down. The scene is interrupted by Caine, who tries to talk sense into Winston. Instead of listening, Winston says goodbye to Harmon and puts the gun to her head. Harmon screams "No!" and lunges forward, but the act is ultimately stopped by Caine, who grabs the gun before Winston can pull the trigger. Winston is arrested while Harmon looks on, obviously hurt and disappointed.

In the Season 8 episode "Into the Wind" (aired on February 1, 2010), Harmon is seen via Skype from a U.S. Army forward operating base outside Kabul, Afghanistan, where it's revealed to viewers that he's joined the armed forces. He reassures his father that he's made the right choice but Caine privately feels otherwise.

In the episode "Dishonor," Harmon has returned to Miami from Afghanistan. At the start of the episode he tells his father that he has decided to return to Afghanistan. Caine is immediately disappointed and worried, and also upset that Harmon did not make the decision with him. Later, Harmon discovers a body on fire and believes it to be his military friend, Brian, who had also returned home. It is soon discovered to be another man, but Brian is still missing. Harmon receives a call from Brian, who asks him to meet him but not to tell Caine. Harmon agrees, but tells Caine anyway. At the end of the episode, Harmon is shown in uniform, ready to return to Afghanistan. He says goodbye to Caine, and offers his hand for a handshake. Caine instead hugs him, tells him he loves him, and that he must come home alive.

He is seen briefly in the episode "Friendly Fire", however the dialogue was not heard.

Personality 
Kyle Harmon is portrayed as impetuous but good-hearted. He is shown to be courageous, and takes any implication of cowardice as a personal insult ("Dangerous Son.") He has respect for the law, but is not afraid to break it when he feels it necessary ("Dangerous Son", "Chain Reaction", "Bombshell", "Divorce Party.") He is extremely independent, and often tries to take care of problems even when they are over his head ("Bombshell", "Divorce Party.")

Harmon shares many qualities and mannerisms with Caine, but is also different from him. Most notably, Kyle is openly emotional and very impatient. He tends to "wear his heart on his sleeve." Caine, on the other hand, is extremely reserved and almost unnaturally patient.

Relationships 
Horatio Caine (David Caruso):
Kyle Harmon met his father when he was sixteen. He is distrustful of him at first, thinking that Caine will abandon him "just like all the others." However, as his mother's condition deteriorates, Harmon seems to grow closer to his father, especially after his father gets him a job as the ME's assistant. By the seventh season, Harmon seems to gravitate more towards Caine, as evidenced by his confessions of the problems with his mother to him. During the eighth season, Caine and Harmon seem to have a close relationship, and Harmon shows great trust in Caine. When Harmon leaves for Afghanistan the second time, Caine tells him that he loves him.

Julia Eberly - Winston (Elizabeth Berkley):
Harmon is very happy to see his mother when she first appears in "Raising Caine," as he has been looking for her for some time. When Julia and Horatio file separate custody suits for him, he ultimately chooses his mother. For a while Harmon is quite protective of his mother. However, as time goes on and Winston's mental condition worsens, Harmon appears to grow somewhat weary of Winston's unpredictable temperament. The breaking point comes after she goes on a rampage in the penultimate episode of season 7 ("Dissolved") and demands Harmon at gunpoint to return with her. He is obviously disappointed as he watches his father have her arrested and later sent to rehab. During the eighth season, Winston is not mentioned by Harmon or Caine, and it is implied that Harmon no longer has much of a relationship, if any at all, with his mother.

References 

"Evan Ellingson." TV.Com. 14 June 2009
CBS. 14 June 2009

CSI: Miami characters
Television characters introduced in 2007